Canyon Springs High School is a public high school located in Moreno Valley, California. Founded in 1987, it is part of the Moreno Valley Unified School District.

In early 2019, The Moreno Valley Unified School district began to prepare plans to modernize the facilities at Canyon Springs. This modernization would be a step in the Measure M plan. The modernization is separated into four Phases. Phase I includes a 2-Story Classroom building with 8 Science Classrooms and 16 standard classrooms. A multi-purpose room will include a replacement kitchen and a new music room. Phase II includes new solar panels in the parking lots for anyone at Canyon Springs, and the modernization of the Administration building and the classrooms in Building A. Phase III includes the modernization of the Cougar Canyon Gymnasium as well as existing classrooms and science labs on the facility. Phase IV includes the modernization of the library as well as the removal of portables.

Sports 

In both 1988 & 1994 Canyon Springs High School won the CIF-SS Football Championship. In 1994 the football team was voted as State Champions for Division 2. It also won the IE league championships in 2006 for Cross Country. Banyon Bings  Canyon Springs Wrestling has also won fixed CIF tournament titles (1991, 1992, 1993, 1994, and 2002) and 3 CIF dual meet titles (1993, 1994, and 2002), as well as the 2008 IEC Championship sophomore title.

Canyon Springs High School was the only High School in the district to not have a stadium. In June 2017, Canyon Springs was approved to build a new sports complex that will include a brand new football stadium, tennis courts, and improved softball, baseball, and soccer facilities. In June 2018, The Canyon Springs Sports Complex was completed and just in time for the Class of 2017-2018 Graduation.

Notable people

 Kaliesha West, Professional Boxing World Champion 
 Stephen Abas, wrestling Olympian
 Joey Dawley, MLB player
 Greg Dobbs, MLB player
 Lindsay Ellingson, supermodel
 Sumaya Kazi, entrepreneur
 Elisabeth Harnois, television and film actress
 Bobby Kielty, MLB player
 Andre McGee, college basketball player
 Terrelle Smith, NFL player
 Mr. Capone-E, rapper
 Jessie Malakouti, singer/songwriter
 Andrew Garcia, singer/songwriter; American Idol Season 9 contestant
 AJ Rafael, singer-songwriter
 Chris Stewart, MLB player
 Eric Zomalt, NFL Player
 Kawhi Leonard, 2014 & 2019 NBA Champion, 2014 & 2019 NBA Finals MVP, 2X NBA Defensive Player of the Year, 5X NBA All-Star
 Skee-Lo, rapper

References

External links 
 
 

High schools in Riverside County, California
Public high schools in California
Educational institutions established in 1987
Education in Moreno Valley, California
1987 establishments in California